Lucius Fisher "Buddy" Foster IV (born July 12, 1957) is an American former child actor. Beginning his professional acting career at the age of eight, Foster is known for his roles in various television series throughout the late 1960s and early 1970s, including Mayberry R.F.D. (1968–1971). With the death of Arlene Golonka, he is the sole surviving regular cast member of the series. Foster is the older brother of actress and director Jodie Foster.

Early life
Foster was born on July 12, 1957, the only son and third of four children born to Lucius Fisher Foster III and Evelyn Ella "Brandy" (née Almond). His parents divorced in the early 1960s, and his mother obtained a job in the entertainment industry to support her children.

Career

Actor
As a child actor, Foster appeared in a regular role on the short-lived TV western Hondo in 1967 
and Mayberry, R.F.D. (1968–1971), as well as appearing in guest-starring roles on numerous other television series throughout the 1970s including The Six Million Dollar Man.

Buddy Foster appeared on the Dragnet TV series in the 1969 episode "Burglary Auto: Juvenile Genius" as James "Watermelon" Chambers. In 1967 he appeared on Petticoat Junction, in the episode: "Temperance, Temperance", as Clint Priddy.

He is also the voice talent of the little boy in the famous 1969 Tootsie Pop commercial Mr. Owl How Many Licks Does It Take? and often confused and credited to Peter Robbins.
 
He made his final screen appearance with a small role in the United Artists feature film, Foxes (1980), which starred his sister, Jodie Foster.

Author
In 1997, Foster authored the book, Foster Child, in which he chronicled his account of his and Jodie's childhood. In the book, he alleged that Jodie was a lesbian or bisexual, and that their mother had a sexual relationship with another woman.

Jodie Foster called the book "[a] cheap cry for attention and money, filled with hazy recollections, fantasies, and borrowed press releases. Buddy has done nothing but break our mother's heart his whole life."

Footnotes

References

External links

 

Living people
Male actors from Los Angeles
American male child actors
American male television actors
American male film actors
20th-century American male actors
Western (genre) television actors
1957 births